R-spondin-3 is a protein that in humans is encoded by the RSPO3 gene.

Function 

This gene encodes a member of the thrombospondin type 1 repeat gene superfamily. In addition, the protein contains a furin-like cysteine-rich region. Furin-like repeat domains have been found in a variety of eukaryotic proteins involved in the mechanism of signal transduction by receptor tyrosine kinases.

During embryonic development, RSPO3 is expressed in the tail bud and the posterior presomitic mesoderm of the embryo. In tissue engineering, R-spondin 3 has been used to differentiate pluripotent stem cells into paraxial mesoderm progenitors

References

Further reading 

 
 
 

Glycoproteins
Extracellular matrix proteins